Sheboygan County Memorial Airport  is a county-owned public-use non-towered airport located in the Town of Sheboygan Falls, three nautical miles (6 km) northwest of the City of Sheboygan, in Sheboygan County, Wisconsin, United States. It is included in the Federal Aviation Administration (FAA) National Plan of Integrated Airport Systems for 2021–2025, in which it is categorized as a regional general aviation facility. Sheboygan's National Weather Service observation station is based at the airport.

Overview 
The airport mainly serves as a corporate aviation base for several county businesses, including Kohler Company, Bemis Manufacturing Company, Plenco and Richardson Bros. An expansion project tying into increasing capacity in advance of the 2010 PGA Championship was completed that year. The airport was upgraded to allow a U.S. Customs presence in advance of the upcoming 2021 Ryder Cup (delayed a year due to the COVID-19 pandemic), while also allowing Kohler and other companies to bypass having to fly their business jets into other nearby international airports such as Appleton or Green Bay. The Customs facility opened in April 2021.

Sheboygan County Memorial also serves as a major link to local attractions such as Road America and the county's golf courses, such as Blackwolf Run and Whistling Straits.
 
Aviation Heritage Center of Wisconsin is located east of the U.S. Customs and Border Protection Terminal Facility.

Facilities and aircraft 
Sheboygan County Memorial Airport covers an area of 737 acres (298 ha) at an elevation of 755 feet (230 m) above mean sea level. It has two runways: 4/22 is 6,800 by 100 feet (2,073 x 30 m) with a concrete surface and 13/31 is 5,002 by 75 feet (1,525 x 23 m) with an asphalt surface.

Burrows Aviation, a privately owned business, is the fixed-base operator (FBO).

For the 12-month period ending June 10, 2020, the airport had 43,200 aircraft operations, an average of 118 per day: 88% general aviation, 12% air taxi and less than 1% military. In January 2023, there were 49 aircraft based at this airport: 37 single-engine, 6 multi-engine and 6 jet.

Accidents and incidents 
 On July 20, 2018, a vintage airplane crashed in a farm field near the airport after taking off. The National Transportation Safety Board says the jet was part of a formation training flight at the Sheboygan County Airport. The pilot was killed on impact. Two farm workers were injured.
 
 On March 4, 2018, hydraulic issues forced a Flight for Life medical helicopter to make an emergency landing at the airport.

Images

See also 
 List of airports in Wisconsin

References

External links 

 Sheboygan County Airport Division at Sheboygan County Government
 Burrows Aviation, the fixed-base operator (FBO)
  at Wisconsin DOT Airport Directory
 

Airports in Wisconsin
Buildings and structures in Sheboygan County, Wisconsin